Fiorino Bianco is a politician in Montreal, Quebec, Canada. He served on the Montreal city council from 1990 to 1994, initially as a member of mayor Jean Doré's Montreal Citizens' Movement (MCM) and later for other parties.

Bianco ran for city council in the suburban Montreal community of Saint-Leonard in the 1982 and 1986 general elections and in a 1985 by-election. He was defeated on all three occasions. In 1990, he was described as a real-estate broker and former union leader.

In the buildup to the 1990 Montreal municipal election, Bianco challenged incumbent councillor Gilles Berthiaume for the MCM party nomination in Rivière-des-Prairies. Berthiaume resigned from the MCM during the contest in a dispute over party memberships; Bianco subsequently won the nomination and narrowly defeated Berthiaume, who ran as an independent, in the general election. In 1991, Bianco supported the Quebec government's decision to lift a building freeze on Île Rochon within his division. He later supported the building of a detention centre in a different part of the community.

Bianco was expelled from the MCM in late August 1993, amid disputed circumstances. Mayor Doré's office stated that Bianco's private difficulties had put him in a vulnerable position; Bianco rejected this and said that he left the party in a dispute over policy. After serving for several months as an independent councillor, Bianco joined the formerly dominant Civic Party of Montreal in June 1994 and was the party's only council representative during the time of its final collapse. Along with several other Civic Party members, he joined the Montrealers' Party later in the year. Bianco ran under the latter party's banner in the 1994 municipal election and was defeated by a candidate of Pierre Bourque's Vision Montreal party.

Bianco planned to run as an independent candidate for borough mayor of Rivière-des-Prairies–Pointe-aux-Trembles in the 2009 Montreal municipal election, but ultimately did not appear on the ballot. He later sought the Vision Montreal nomination for a 2010 by-election for the same position, but lost to Chantal Rouleau.

Electoral record

References

Year of birth missing (living people)
Living people
Montreal city councillors